The Mosquito and Coal Creek logging railroad was a  long private logging railway with a gauge of 3 foot (914 mm) near Eufaula, Washington.

History

Construction 
Grading of the track with a maximum grade of 5 % began on 2 January 1883 and the first rails with a weight of 56 lbs/yard (17.5 kg/m) were laid in the same year. The first train operated on 13 October 1883.

Operation 
B.F. Brock operated his narrow gauge logging railway in Coal Creek near Eufaula from 1883 to 30 June 1904, when it was absorbed by the Eastern and Western Lumber Company. It ran from the logging camp on Eufaula Heights downhill to Coal Creek Slough, where the logs were dumped into the river. In 1896 it was listed as having 3.2 miles of line, in 1901 it had 8 miles and finally in 1903 even 10 miles (5.1 km, 12.9 km and 16.1 km).

Takeover 
The company was renamed Eastern & Western Lumber Company on 1 July 1904. At one point in history, Mosquito Creek was renamed Harmony Creek.

Closure 
The Eastern and Western Lumber Company went out of business 1926.

Rolling stock 

The Ant was an  steam locomotive made by Fulton Iron Works in September 1871. It had  cylinders and a weight of 7 tons, running on a 3 foot 6 gauge. It was first used as Seattle & Walla Walla Railroad #5 (Feb 1878), then as the first Columbia and Puget Sound Railroad #5 (Nov 1880). Then it was sold to Ordway & Weidler Oak Point, Washington (May 1883) before it came to B. F. Brock (Mosquito & Coal Creek RR) at a price of $2000 near Stella, Washington (Oct 1883). It retired in 1890 and was displayed by W. H. Williamson  at Stella in 1903. It was then acquired by Long-Bell Lbr. Co. Longview, WA (1923) and donated to the Longview, Portland and Northern Railway (1924) before it came to the City of Longview, Washington, where it was displayed and shown on parades. From there it was stolen and finally scrapped in 1937.

The second steam engine was a larger , which had been built by Baldwin Locomotive Works in 1890 with a weight of 28,000 lbs (12.8 tonnes).

In 1901 the B. F. Brock Logging Company acquired a new two-truck Shay locomotive with builder's No 272 of 1901. Further locomotives were acquired after the takeover.

By 30 June 1910 the Eastern & Western Lumber Company had a rolling stock of three Geared steam locomotives, two rod engines, 40 logging trucks, nine flat cars.

References 

Logging in the United States
Transportation in Cowlitz County, Washington
3 ft gauge railways in the United States